The Language for Systems Development (LSD) was a programming language developed in 1971 at Brown University for the IBM System/360. The language was also referred to as LSyD due to the negative connotations of the acronym "LSD" at the time. LSD was derived from PL/I.

References

External links

IBM System/360 mainframe line
Systems programming languages